Jean Shinglewood Medawar, Lady Medawar (née Taylor; 7 February 1913 – 3 May 2005) was a British author and a former chairman of the Family Planning Association, and wife of the British Nobel laureate Sir Peter Brian Medawar.

Medawar was born in London, England, the daughter of Katherine Leslie (née Paton) and Charles Henry Shinglewood Taylor. Her father was a physician working in Cambridge. Her mother was an American from St Louis, Missouri.

She attended Benenden School in Kent and she won a scholarship to study zoology. She joined Somerville College, Oxford, and earned her BSc in zoology in 1935.  She continued to work on the origin and development of lymphocytes under Howard Florey (who later won the Nobel Prize in Physiology or Medicine in 1945) until her marriage in 1937. In 1954, she met Margaret Pyke, Chair of the Family Planning Association, and joined the organisation. She became a member of its executive in 1960. In 1959 she became Joint Editor of the journal Family Planning (continued as Family Planning Today) alongside David Pyke, Pyke's son, and remained till 1979. She also worked with the Citizens' Advice Bureau, the National Marriage Guidance Council and also with young offenders at HM Prison Holloway at Hampstead. She was appointed chairman of the FPA in 1966, owing to the death of Margaret Pyke, and held the post till 1970. She co-founded the Margaret Pyke Centre for Study and Training in Family Planning and the Margaret Pyke Memorial Trust in 1968, becoming its Director in 1976 until her death.

Life with Peter Medawar

Medawar published her memoir A Very Decided Preference: Life with Peter Medawar in 1990 in which she gives an account of her personal life. She met Peter Medawar in Oxford, with the first impression that he looked 'mildly diabolical'. She approached him for the meaning of "heuristic", which led to a continued tutorial and lasting friendship. Her family did not want her to marry him because Peter Medawar was of Lebanese descent and was not financially well-to-do. Her mother asked her, "What will you do if you have black babies?" Her aunt described Medawar as having 'no background, no money', and eventually disinherited her. They were married on 27 February 1937. They had two sons, Charles and Alexander, and two daughters, Caroline and Louise. She devoted her time raising their children while her husband was committed to scientific research. Her husband won the Nobel Prize in Physiology or Medicine in 1960. Together they wrote The Life Science : Current Ideas of Biology in 1977, and Aristotle to Zoos : A Philosophical Dictionary of Biology in 1984.

Through her daughter Caroline's marriage to political cartoonist Nicholas Garland, her grandson is director and writer Alex Garland.

After death, she shared her husband's grave in the graveyard of St Andrew's Church in Alfriston in East Sussex.

Works 
 [with David Pyke]
 [With Peter Brian Medawar]

 [With Peter Brian Medawar]

 [with David Pyke]

References

External links 
 Daily Telegraph obituary
 Guardian obituary

1913 births
2005 deaths
People educated at Benenden School
Alumni of Somerville College, Oxford
British women activists
British women writers
English women biologists
Academic journal editors